CJFB Performance Award is a Bangladeshi film and music award made by the Cultural Journalists' Forum of Bangladesh.

The  award started in 2000 and it was held for the 16th time on 19 December 2016 at Basundhara Convention City Hall, Dhaka. It is sponsored by Uro, a beverage company.  It is sometimes described as Uro-Cola CJFB Performance Award.

Categories
(Some categories are irregular)

Best Film
Best Director
Best Actor
Best Actress
Best Male Singer
Best Female Singer
Best Music Director
Best Lyrics
Best Pop Singer
Best Debut Singer
Best Television Actor
Best Television Actress
Most Popular Television Artist
Best Television Director
Best Advertisement Director
Best Male Model
Best Female Model
Lifetime Achievement Award
Special Award (music)
Special Award (journalism)
Best Event Organizer
Best YouTube Channel
Best YouTuber
Popular Streaming Platform

Ceremonies
1st CJFB Performance Award
2nd CJFB Performance Award
3rd CJFB Performance Award
4th CJFB Performance Award
5th CJFB Performance Award
6th CJFB Performance Award
7th CJFB Performance Award
8th CJFB Performance Award
9th CJFB Performance Award
10th CJFB Performance Award
11th CJFB Performance Award
12th CJFB Performance Award
13th CJFB Performance Award
14th CJFB Performance Award
15th CJFB Performance Award
16th CJFB Performance Award
17th CJFB Performance Award

References

Bangladeshi film awards
CJFB Performance Award Winners
Bangladeshi music awards